Vincenza Sicari (born 19 March 1979 in Lodi) is an Italian long-distance runner. She represented Italy internationally in cross country running early in her career, but later moved on to road events. She has appeared at the IAAF World Half Marathon Championships on three occasions and ran in the marathon for Italy at the 2008 Beijing Olympics.

She has competed extensively on the Italian road circuit and has won marathons in Carpi, Padua, and Turin. Her personal best of 2:29:51 hours, set in 2008, came at the latter race.

Biography
She started her international career as a cross country runner: she ran as a junior at the 1998 IAAF World Cross Country Championships, made her senior debut at the European Cross Country Championships in 2001, and ran in the short race at the 2003 World Cross Championships. She began competing for the Italian Army team in 2004 and this coincided with her first national title, becoming champion over 10,000 metres. She recorded a half marathon best of 1:13:42 hours at the Napoli Half Marathon and represented Italy in that event at the 2004 IAAF World Half Marathon Championships, coming 34th. She was 45th at the European Cross Country Championships that December.

Sicari had her best placing at the World Cross Country Championships in 2005, placing 40th in the long race. She was runner-up at the Stramilano half marathon in April, setting a personal best of 1:12:39 minutes behind Anikó Kálovics. She was selected to compete on the track at the 2005 Mediterranean Games and she was sixth over 10,000 m. She also represented Italy at the World Half Marathon and the European Cross Country Championships that year.

Her debut marathon run came in October 2006 at the Italian Marathon in Carpi. She used the event to test her fitness over the distance and she came third. A run at the Florence Marathon followed and she fought off a challenge from Gloria Marconi to take a clear victory in 2:34:52 hours, although she slowed in the latter stages due to liver problems.

In January 2007 she won the 6 km race at the Montefortiana Turà in Monteforte d'Alpone. She knocked more than four minutes off her best at the 2007 Maratona di Sant'Antonio in Padua and won the women's race. She eased to victory at the Scalata al Castello 5 km and stated that she was keen to form part of the national marathon team for the 2007 World Championships in Athletics. However, she missed out on the squad and instead had to make do with an appearance at the 2007 IAAF World Road Running Championships in Udine (where she was 24th). The Florence Marathon offered her a chance gain a place for the 2008 Italian Olympic team and she won the race for a second year running.

Sicari began 2008 with a win at the Maratonina dei Tre Comuni, followed by a second-place finish at the Rome-Ostia Half Marathon in a personal best of 1:10:21 hours. An attempt to gain an Olympic place at the Rome City Marathon failed after she dropped out of the race. She rebounded with a win at the La Lagarina half marathon later that month and just dipped under FIDAL's time standard of two hours thirty minutes at the Turin Marathon, gaining selection and the women's title in a personal best of 2:29:51 hours. She won the women's race at the Trofeo San Vittore in June. On her debut Olympic appearance at the 2008 Beijing Olympics Marathon she came 29th with a time of 2:33:31 hours. She brought her year to a close with a third-place finish at the Turin Half Marathon and a win at the Straconi Golden Run in Cuneo.

She competed in a number of half marathons in 2009, winning the Valli e Pinete Half Marathon and the Maratonina di Cremona, as well as having a top five finish at the Stramilano. She won a second title at the Maratonina dei Tre Comuni at the start of 2010, but did not run competitively for the rest of the year.

Achievements

See also
 Italian all-time lists - Half marathon

References

External links
 
Vincenza Sicari at Marathon Info

Living people
1979 births
Italian female long-distance runners
Italian female marathon runners
Athletes (track and field) at the 2008 Summer Olympics
Olympic athletes of Italy
People from Lodi, Lombardy
Athletes (track and field) at the 2005 Mediterranean Games
Mediterranean Games competitors for Italy
Sportspeople from the Province of Lodi
20th-century Italian women
21st-century Italian women